Whitefield is an unincorporated community in Bureau and Marshall counties, Illinois, United States. It is located approximately nine miles west-northwest of Henry and the Illinois River. Crow Creek flows past to the north of the community.

References

Unincorporated communities in Bureau County, Illinois
Unincorporated communities in Marshall County, Illinois
Unincorporated communities in Illinois
Peoria metropolitan area, Illinois